Labeo brachypoma is fish in genus Labeo which comes from west Africa, probably western Nigeria where the type specimens were most likely to have been collected.

References 

 

Endemic fauna of Nigeria
Labeo
Fish described in 1868
Taxa named by Albert Günther